The 2008 Challenger de Providencia, also named Copa Kia for sponsorship reasons, was a men's tennis tournament played on outdoor clay courts. It was the 4th edition of the event, and part of the 2008 ATP Challenger Series of the 2008 ATP Tour. It took place at the tennis courts at the Club Providencia in Providencia, Santiago, Chile, from 25 February through 2 March 2008.

Points and prize money

Point distribution

Prize money

* per team

Singles main draw entrants

Seeds

1 Rankings as of 18 February 2008.

Other entrants
The following players received wildcards into the singles main draw:
  Julio Peralta
  Hans Podlipnik-Castillo
  Guillermo Rivera Aránguiz
  Ricardo Urzúa Rivera

The following players received entry from the qualifying draw:
  Juan Pablo Amado
  Rogério Dutra Silva
  Peter Polansky
  Diego Veronelli

Doubles main draw entrants

Seeds

1 Rankings as of 18 February 2008.

Other entrants
The following pairs received wildcards into the doubles main draw:
  Guillermo Hormazábal /  Hans Podlipnik-Castillo
  Mariano Hood /  Eduardo Schwank
  Guillermo Rivera Aránguiz /  Ricardo Urzúa Rivera

Withdrawals
During the tournament
  Gustavo Marcaccio /  Adrián Menéndez-Maceiras → in first round
  Sebastián Decoud /  Horacio Zeballos → in first round
  Francesco Aldi /  Simone Vagnozzi → in quarterfinals
  Jorge Aguilar /  Adrián García → in semifinals

Champions

Singles

  Thomaz Bellucci defeated  Eduardo Schwank, 6–4, 7–6(7–3)

Doubles

  Mariano Hood /  Eduardo Schwank defeated  Brian Dabul /  Jean-Julien Rojer, 6–3, 6–3

References

External links
 Official Results Archive (ATP)
 Official Results Archive (ITF)
 Singles Draw (ATP)
 Doubles Draw (ATP)
 Club Providencia website

Providencia
Cachantún Cup (ATP)
Cach